Frank Nugent was an American writer.

Frank Nugent may also refer to:

Frank Nugent (cricketer) (1880–1942), British Army officer and cricketer
Frank Nugent, spy of the Cambridge Five
Frank Nugent, a character in crime thriller film 16 Blocks
Frank Nugent, a character in The Secret Seven

See also
Francis Nugent, Irish priest